Margarella wacei is a species of sea snail, a marine gastropod mollusk in the family Calliostomatidae.

Description
The height of the shell attains 8 mm.

Distribution
This marine species occurs in the Atlantic Ocean off the Falkland Islands.

References

 Melvill, J. C. and R. Standen. 1918. Photinula wacei sp. n. from the Falkland Islands. Journal of Conchology 15: 234

External links
 To Encyclopedia of Life
 To World Register of Marine Species

wacei
Gastropods described in 1918